Carlos Alberto Betancur Gómez (born 13 October 1989) is a Colombian road racing cyclist, who most recently rode for Colombian amateur team .

Career 
In 2010 he won the Girobio stage race; the amateur version of the Giro d'Italia; and in 2011 he won his first professional race at the Giro dell'Emilia.

Betancur left  at the end of the 2012 season, and joined  on a two-year contract from the 2013 season onwards.

Ag2r–La Mondiale (2013–15)
He started his 2013 season with a seventh-place finish at the Tour of the Basque Country, including a second place on stage 3.

After a 12th-place finish at the Tour de Romandie, Betancur went in to the Giro d'Italia as an outsider for a top 10 GC position. Initially things went poorly, as he lost time on the descent of stage 3 and on the long time trial of stage 8, by the end of which he was down in 28th position, 6:08 down on the leader and eventual winner Nibali. However, following second places on stages 9, 10, and 15, and some brilliant performances in the other mountain stages, he worked himself up to 7th place and just two seconds off the white jersey for the best young rider (which he had actually gained on stage 15, but lost in the stage 18 time trial) by the penultimate stage. On the final mountain stage, although he punctured at the bottom of the final climb, he managed to catch up and overtake most of his GC rivals, finishing 4th on the day. He ended the Giro as best young rider and 5th in the general Classification.

In December 2013, Betancur confirmed he would be focusing on the Tour de France for 2014. However, he failed to fly from his training base in Colombia to France on 3 June, blaming a viral infection, and changed his target to the Vuelta a España.

In August 2015  announced that they had come to an agreement with Betancur to release him from his contract with the team, which was due to run until the end of 2016.

Movistar Team (2016–20)
In October 2015, the  announced that they had agreed an initial two-year deal with Betancur from 2016. Betancur won his first race for the team – the first stage of the 2016 Vuelta a Castilla y León – ending a 760-day wait for a victory. The last race he had won was the 2014 Paris–Nice.

In June 2017, he was named in the startlist for the 2017 Tour de France.

Colombia Tierra de Atletas–GW Bicicletas
For the 2021 season, Betancur joined the  team. In April, he announced that he was taking a break from cycling.

Major results

2009
 1st  Overall Vuelta de la Juventud de Colombia
1st Stage 4
 2nd  Road race, UCI Under-23 Road World Championships
2010
 1st  Overall Girobio
1st Stages 4 & 5
 1st Stage 1 (TTT) Vuelta a Colombia
2011
 1st Giro dell'Emilia
 5th Gran Premio Industria e Commercio Artigianato Carnaghese
 9th Giro di Lombardia
2012
 1st Trofeo Melinda
 1st Stage 5 Tour of Belgium
 1st  Mountains classification Circuit de Lorraine
 2nd Giro di Toscana
 4th Overall Giro del Trentino
1st  Young rider classification
 4th Overall Four Days of Dunkirk
 5th Milano–Torino
 5th Gran Piemonte
 7th Circuito de Getxo
 8th Overall Monviso-Venezia — Il Padania
1st  Young rider classification
1st Stage 5
 8th Trofeo Matteotti
 9th GP Industria & Artigianato di Larciano
2013
 3rd La Flèche Wallonne
 4th Liège–Bastogne–Liège
 5th Overall Giro d'Italia
1st  Young rider classification
 7th Overall Tour of the Basque Country
2014
 1st  Overall Paris–Nice
1st  Young rider classification
1st Stages 5 & 6
 1st  Overall Tour du Haut Var
1st  Points classification
1st Stage 1
2016
 1st Stage 2 Vuelta a Asturias
 9th Overall Vuelta a Castilla y León
1st Stage 1
2018
 4th Klasika Primavera
 5th GP Miguel Induráin
2019
 1st Klasika Primavera
 8th Overall Tour de Suisse

General classification results timeline

References

External links 

1989 births
Living people
Colombian male cyclists
Sportspeople from Antioquia Department